Post-harvest Technology Application Centre (PTAC) is a post-harvest sector in Kyungalay Village, Hlegu Township, Myanmar. It is located on the Yangon-Bago main highway, 25 km from Yangon.

References

Science and technology in Myanmar